Bapu Velnathji Thakor also called as Dada Velnathji Thakor , Girnari Sant Velnathji was a 17th century Koli  saint from Girnar, Gujarat. He was grandson of Amarji Thakor who was king of Chunval Pradesh.

Early life and family 
The Velnathi was born to a Koli saint Jodhaji Jhala and Amarbai of Padariya. His grandfather Amarji Thakor was chieftain of Padariya Jagir in Gujarat. His family clan was Jhala Makawana of Koli caste. He was married to two Rajput girls Jasubha and Minabha.

See also 
 Kanua Baba
 Koli rebellions
 Koli piracy in India
 List of Koli people
 List of Koli states and clans

References

Indian Hindu saints
Koli people
People from Gujarat